"The Last Flight" is episode 18 of the American television anthology series The Twilight Zone. Part of the production was filmed on location at Norton Air Force Base in San Bernardino, California. The vintage 1918 Nieuport 28 biplane was both owned and flown by Frank Gifford Tallman, and had previously appeared in many World War I motion pictures.

Opening narration

Plot
Flight Lieutenant (actually Second Lieutenant) William Terrance "Terry" Decker of 56 Squadron Royal Flying Corps lands his Nieuport biplane on an American airbase in France, after flying through a strange cloud. He is immediately accosted by provost marshal Major Wilson, who is dumbfounded by Decker's archaic appearance. Decker, likewise, is baffled, but by the unexplainable large modern aircraft. He is then taken into custody and questioned by the American base commander, Major General George Harper, and by Wilson. Decker snaps to attention, identifying himself as being from the UK's Royal Flying Corps (the predecessor of the modern Royal Air Force). This puzzles Harper and Wilson. Harper, seeing Decker's antique uniform, queries Decker if a vintage air show is nearby, or if he is making a film—Decker has no idea of what he is asked. He then asks Harper: "Excuse me sir, but where exactly am I?" Harper sardonically responds, "Where exactly did you think you were?", to which Decker says, "Well, I thought I was landing at 56th Squadron RFC." When asked to identify the year, Decker answers that it's 1917. When they inform him it's March 5, 1959, he is stunned.

Decker tells the officers his flying partner Alexander Mackaye and he were fighting seven German aircraft; Mackaye was shot down and Decker escaped into a cloud. The Americans, to Decker's astonishment, inform him Mackaye is alive and is an air vice marshal in the Royal Air Force, a war hero from World War II who saved hundreds, if not thousands of lives by shooting down German bombers over London. The American officers add that Air Vice Marshal Mackaye, in addition to being alive and well, is coming to the base that very day for an inspection. Decker says that is impossible, as Mackaye is dead. Harper, at this time, confiscates Decker's pistol and personal effects. Later, Major Wilson tries to help Decker remember what happened. Decker finally confesses that he has consistently avoided combat throughout his service, and that he deliberately abandoned the greatly outnumbered Mackaye when the two were attacked by the German fighters. He refuses to believe that Mackaye somehow survived against such odds.

When Wilson suggests that someone else helped Mackaye, Decker realizes that he has been given a second chance. He tells the American officer that  no one was within 50 miles who could have come to Mackaye's aid, so if Mackaye survived, it had to be because Decker went back himself. Knowing he cannot have much time to go back to 1917, Decker pleads with Wilson to release him from custody. When Wilson refuses, Decker assaults him and a guard and hurriedly escapes (without his badge and personal items). Running outside, he locates his plane, punches a mechanic who tries to get in his way, and starts the plane's engine. He is about to take off when Wilson catches up and puts a pistol to his head. Decker tells Wilson he will have to shoot him to stop him. After hesitating, Wilson allows him to escape and Decker flies his plane into white clouds and vanishes.

Wilson is rebuked by Harper for believing such a fantastic story and for allowing "that madman" to escape. When Mackaye arrives and takes a seat, and Wilson asks him about Decker, he says "Oh I certainly should know him—he saved my life." Mackaye proceeds to recount how Decker and he were attacked by seven German aircraft while out on patrol. Decker, in his fit of cowardice, flew away, disappearing in a cloud, with Mackaye thinking at first that Decker had abandoned him. Suddenly, Decker came diving out of the cloud with his aircraft guns blazing, and proceeded to shoot down three of the German planes before being shot down himself. With Decker's unbelievable story now corroborated by Mackaye, Wilson comes to believe what Decker had told him. General Harper, now also beginning to believe Decker, asks Mackaye if the Germans returned Decker's personal items, to which Mackaye responds no. Baffled, Harper then shows Mackaye the confiscated identification photo card and other personal effects of his young friend Decker, startling him. As Mackaye gets increasingly agitated, Wilson suggests, "Maybe you'd better sit down, Old Leadbottom", shocking Mackaye further with that nickname known only to Decker and him, from over 42 years earlier. "What did you call me?", he incredulously asks.

Closing narration

Episode notes
This was the first episode of The Twilight Zone scripted by Richard Matheson.  Rod Serling had previously adapted the episodes "And When the Sky Was Opened" and "Third from the Sun" from short stories of Matheson's.

Radio historian Martin Grams Jr. noted the similarities between this episode and a 1948 episode of the acclaimed radio drama series Quiet, Please called "One for the Book". According to Grams' book The Twilight Zone: Unlocking the Door to a Television Classic, Serling himself was so concerned about the similarities that he attempted to buy the rights to the Quiet, Please episode to avoid any potential copyright infringement.

Inaccuracies

The United States Air Force major general repeatedly refers to Mackaye as "sir", and suggests that he is a superior officer inspecting the air base. However, Mackaye is ranked as an air vice marshal, which is a Royal Air Force rank equivalent to major general, thereby making the two officers equals.  Unless, of course, the American general was junior in rank by date of commission (the reason so often cited, on Hogan's Heroes for Colonel Crittenden technically outranking Hogan). The Royal Flying Corps never flew the Nieuport 28, which also did not enter service until 1918.  The death of Georges Guynemer is mentioned by Decker, but Guynemer died in September 1917, six months after Decker's last flight.  Finally, 56 Squadron was not deployed until April 1917, at which point it flew the S.E.5 aircraft. The rank of flight lieutenant existed in the Royal Naval Air Service and later in the RAF, but it never was used in the Royal Flying Corps.  However, the only reference to "flight lieutenant" is during Mr. Serling's introduction; during the episode itself, Decker refers to himself as "second lieutenant", which is the correct rank for the RFC. However, "second lieutenant", the most junior commissioned officer rank, is equal to a "pilot officer" in the RAF. Flight lieutenant is equal to the Army rank of captain.

Further reading
 DeVoe, Bill (2008). Trivia from The Twilight Zone. Albany, GA: Bear Manor Media. .
 Grams, Martin (2008). The Twilight Zone: Unlocking the Door to a Television Classic. Churchville, MD: OTR Publishing. .

External links
 

1960 American television episodes
Adaptations of works by Richard Matheson
Television episodes about death
Television episodes written by Richard Matheson
Television episodes based on short fiction
Television episodes about time travel
The Twilight Zone (1959 TV series season 1) episodes
Television episodes about World War I
Fiction set in 1917
Fiction set in 1959
Television episodes set in France